The Boston Trade High School for Boys was a high school that was located in Roxbury, Boston. It was founded in 1929 and closed in 1970. The building was acquired by Wentworth Institute of Technology and called The Annex. Since 1984, the building has been hosting classes for Wentworth students and currently houses Wentworth’s Design and Facilities, Architecture, and Civil, Construction and Environment Departments.

References

High schools in Boston
Educational institutions established in 1929
Educational institutions disestablished in 1970
Public high schools in Massachusetts
1929 establishments in Massachusetts
1970 disestablishments in Massachusetts
Roxbury, Boston
Defunct schools in Massachusetts